Yerbas Buenas is a Chilean town and commune in Linares Province, Maule Region.

Demography
According to the 2002 census of the National Statistics Institute, Yerbas Buenas had a population of 16,134 (8,380 men and 7,754 women). Of these, 1,595 (9.9%) lived in urban areas (the town of Yerbas Buenas), and 14,539 (90.1%) lived in rural areas. The population grew 4.1% (634 persons) between the censuses of 1992 and 2002.

Geography
Its entire territory lies within the central plain or "depresión intermedia", (Chilean Central Valley). Yerbas Buenas is bordered on the west by San Javier and Villa Alegre, on the north by San Clemente, (Talca Province); on the east, by Colbún, and on the south, by Linares.

Geographic Coordinates
 Altitude: 
 Latitude: 35°45′00″S
 Longitude: 71°34′00″W

Heritage
Yerbas Buenas is a historical town with a cultural heritage and distinctive Spanish-style architecture. The town is a typical example of the preserved rural colonial architecture found sometimes in small towns and in large haciendas (estates) in Latin America. Whole streets are composed only of Spanish-style buildings from the colonial period, which is very rare in Chile.

Historical Museum
The Historical Museum of Yerbas Buenas is housed in a preserved, colonial building that is not only one of the oldest surviving in the town and province but also a silent witness of the dawn of Chile's independence. This was the house where the Spanish brigadier Antonio Pareja, commander of the royalist army, stayed on the night of April 26, 1813, the eve of the first significant military encounter between the royalist and the patriot armies in the independence struggle of Chile. Colonel Juan de Dios Puga, commander of the patriot force, was killed in the battle as was one third of his army. This building became a National Historic Monument on August 22, 1984 and the sector of the town around the building has been declared a "Typical Zone" (Zona típica).

Administration
As a commune, Yerbas Buenas is a third-level administrative division of Chile administered by a municipal council, headed by an alcalde who is directly elected every four years. The 2008-2012 alcalde is Luis Guzmán Trujillo (PRSD).The municipal council has the following members:
 Eliana Parada Yáñez (PS)
 Mariano Sanhueza Retamal (PRI)
 Sergio Muñoz Espinoza (PRSD)
 Eva Palma Leal (RN)
 Fernando Arturo Astete Mendiburo (ILA)
 Oscar Bonilla Menchaca (UDI)

Within the electoral divisions of Chile, Yerbas Buenas is represented in the Chamber of Deputies by Jorge Tarud (PDC) and Romilio Gutiérrez (UDI) as part of the 39th electoral district, together with Linares, Colbún, San Javier and Villa Alegre. The commune is represented in the Senate by Hernán Larraín (UDI) and Ximena Rincón González (PDC) as part of the 11th senatorial constituency (Maule-South).

References

External links
  Municipality of Yerbas Buenas
  Yerbas Buenas Museum of History
 Google map of Yerbas Buenas

Populated places in Linares Province
Communes of Chile
Populated places established in 1744
1744 establishments in the Spanish Empire